Abdolsamad Kambakhsh (birth name Abdolsamad Adle Qajar; 1902 or 1903 – 1971) son of Prince Kamran Mirza Adle Qajar, also known by his aliases as Abdolsamad Qanbari or the Red Prince, was an Iranian communist political activist. n the early 1925 he married feminist activist Dr. Akhtar Kianouri. Noureddin Kianouri the younger brother of Dr. Akhtar Kianouri grew up in their house.

He educated three times in Russia, first time before 1917 Russian Revolution in a Military School, Second in Military Academy and later graduated as Aeroengineer & military instructor, and third times started as aspirant in Economical Sciences and Later graduated as Dr of Historical science from Moscow State University. 

He was the first and only Iranian member of Communist International (Comintern).

He was the author of some books such as “The October Revolution and Liberation Movements in Iran” & “Fifty Years of the Proletarian Party in Iran”,  “Reminiscences on the Educational Society in Qazvin”, “Reflections on the History of the Tudeh (Communist) Part”,  “The Formation of the Tudeh (Left) Party”, “The Tudeh Party in the Struggle to Create a Democratic United”, “Notes on the History of the Iranian Army”, Articles/Books about “History of the Azerbaijan Movement”, “The failure of the movement in Azerbaijan and Kurdistan ”, and “History of the Khorasan Movement”. But his ref. book and dissertation was Comments on the Workers’ and Communist Movement in Iran (Nazari Beh Jonbeshi Kargari va Komunist-i dar Iran) in two cover, first cover in 290 Pages. The first volums of the books  is about the only organized resistance against the pro-Hitler Coalition and Regime during the Reza Shah era.
 
From CIA Point of view Abdossamad Kambakhsh was the  founder of Tudeh Party and Azerbaijan  Movement. From Point of view of Russian he was the Iranian represent in Communist International (Comintern) and one of them. From point of view of Iranians he was the "Voice of Russia" in Iran.

Kambakhsh was member of the "group of fifty-three", he was an influential member of the Tudeh Party of Iran and belonged to the party's hardline faction.

Political life
Kambakhsh, who was to be a prominent Tudeh leader in future years, was also one of the few “Fifty-three” with experience in the youth section of the Communist party. The son of a Qajar prince, he was born and raised in Qazvin and sent to study in Russia in 1915.
Deeply impressed by the Bolshevik Revolution, he joined the Socialist and Communist Parties upon returning to Qazvin, and helped organize the local educational society. Despite his political affiliations, the government sent him to Russia in 1927 to study mechanical engineering. At the time of his arrest in 1937, Kabakhsh was an instructor of engineering at the military academy and the manager of the army mechanics school outside Tehran. The contacts he developed in these years proved highly useful later when the Tudeh decided to form cells within the military.

In the introduction of Kambakhsh's book the Workers’ and Communist Movement in Iran, Ehsan Tabari names him as the only Iranian trusted by Joseph Stalin and the Soviets.

Bibliography
 A Review of the Workers 'and Communist Movement in Iran: A Collection of Articles by Kambakhsh, Abdolsamad, 1350-1282.
 the Revolutionary Social Democracy in the Persian Constitutional Revolution
 History of the Tudeh Party of Iran
 From the beginning till the second congress of Tudeh Party of Iran 
 About the Second Congress of  Party of Iran (Urmia Congress)
 Tudeh Party of Iran - The Age of Public Struggle
 From the formation of the Tudeh Party of Iran till the first congress
 From the first state conference to the first  congress of Tudeh Party of Iran
 First Party Congress of Tudeh Party of Iran
 From the first party congress to the Azerbaijani movement
 The failure of the movement in Azerbaijan and Kurdistan
 End of open public activity for Tudeh Party of Iran
 The Tudeh Party of Iran's struggle against imperialism and internal reaction in private
 About the activities of the Revolutionary Social Democracy and the Communist Party of Iran
 The role of the Tudeh Party of Iran in the history of the liberation movement of our homeland
 The Tudeh Party of Iran in the struggle to form a united national and democratic front
 A glimpse of the history of the Iranian army and the democratic struggles within it
 Certificate of a life history

 Volume 2 of the book The Iranian Workers' and Communist Movement, Dr. Kambakhsh Encyclopedia (untranslated into German and Russian)

Anti-Russian Campaign and pro Fascists in Iran and point of view about Abdossamad Kambakhsh
Kambakhsh was known for his close connections to the Soviet intelligence agencies, including the OGPU, the NKVD and the KGB.

Scholar Maziar Behrooz argues that "Kambakhsh was not a theorist but a party functionary with strong personal connections to the Soviets".

Early life and education 
Kambakhsh was born in 1902 or 1903 in Qazvin, and came from an aristocrat Qajar family. He was grown up in his birthplace, and went to study in Soviet Union in 1915. Inspired by the Russian Revolution, he returned to Iran and joined the Socialist and Communist parties. He then resided in Tehran and became a factory manager. Despite his political leanings, the Persian government granted him a scholarship in 1927 and he was sent to Russia for university. At Moscow University, he studied aeronautics between 1928 and 1932.

Career 
He represented Tudeh in the 22nd Congress of the Communist Party of the Soviet Union.

According to written statements of Khosro Rouzbeh in military court, Kambakhsh initiated the activities of Tudeh Military Network in early 1944.

In the first congress of Tudeh held in August 1944, Kambakhsh was elected to the central committee.

After the 1946 Azerbaijan revolt, he was prosecuted with a warrant and as a result he fled the country. The military tribunal sentenced him to death in absentia, forcing him into exile until his death.

References 

1900s births
1971 deaths
Iranian prisoners and detainees
Imperial Iranian Air Force personnel
Iranian people convicted of spying for the Soviet Union
Tudeh Military Network members
Central Committee of the Tudeh Party of Iran members
Second Secretaries of Tudeh Party of Iran
Tudeh Party of Iran MPs
Foreign Communist Party of the Soviet Union members
Iranian expatriates in East Germany
Iranian expatriates in the Soviet Union
Iranian aviators
Socialist Party (Iran) politicians
Moscow State University alumni
Members of the 14th Iranian Majlis
People sentenced to death in absentia
People from Qazvin
Communist Party of Persia politicians